The 1998 MTN Under-19 World Cup was an international limited-overs cricket tournament played in South Africa from 11 January to 1 February 1998. Sponsored by the MTN Group, it was the second edition of the Under-19 Cricket World Cup, coming ten years after the inaugural tournament in 1988, and the first to be held in South Africa.

Sixteen teams participated at the 1998 World Cup, up from only eight at the previous edition. After an initial group stage, the top eight teams played off in a super league to decide the tournament champions, with the non-qualifiers playing a separate "plate" competition. The tournament was won by England, which defeated New Zealand in the final to win its first and only title. New Zealand have failed to reach the final since then, whilst England have qualified for the final in 2022 but lost to India. Matches were held at venues around the country, though primarily in the interior, with the main final held at Wanderers Stadium in Johannesburg. West Indian batsman Chris Gayle led the tournament in runs, while his teammate Ramnaresh Sarwan and Zimbabwe's Mluleki Nkala were the joint leading wicket-takers.

Teams and qualification

The twelve ICC members that had qualified their senior teams for the 1999 World Cup also automatically qualified their under-19 teams for the 1998 Under-19 World Cup. Of those teams, nine were Test-playing countries and three were ICC associate members.

 
 
 
 
 
 

 
 
 
 
 
 

The other four teams were invited to the tournament based on criteria set by the ICC – unlike at later editions, only one regional qualification tournament, the 1997 Youth Asia Cup, was played.

Pool stage

Pool A
Pool A was known as the Bradman Pool, after former Australian batsman Sir Donald Bradman.

Pool B
Pool B was known as the Cowdrey Pool, after former English batsman Sir Colin Cowdrey.

Pool C
Pool C was known as the Gavaskar Pool, after former Indian batsman Sunil Gavaskar.

Pool D
Pool D was known as the Sobers Pool, after former West Indian all-rounder Sir Garfield Sobers.

Plate competition
The plate competition was contested by the eight teams that failed to qualify for the Super League.

Pool A
Pool A was known as the Magiet Pool, after South African administrator Rushdie Magiet.

Pool B
Pool B was known as the Procter Pool, after former South African all-rounder Mike Procter.

Plate Final

Super Eights

Pool A
Pool A was known as the D'Olivera Pool, after former England international Basil D'Oliveira.

Pool B
Pool B was known as the Pollock Pool, after former South African batsman Graeme Pollock.

Final

References

External links
 Series home at ESPN Cricinfo

1998 in cricket
1998
1998 in South African cricket
International cricket competitions in South Africa